A deadly weapon is a lethal instrument.

Deadly Weapon, 1989 American science fiction film directed by Michael Miner and starring Rodney Eastman.
Deadly Weapons, 1974 American exploitation film starring burlesque performer Chesty Morgan and porn star Harry Reems.
Deadly Weapons (album) by Steve Beresford, John Zorn, Tonie Marshall and David Toop 1986 
"Deadly Weapons", song on The World Outside (Eyes Set to Kill album)